The XI African Taekwondo Championships took place in Agadir, Morocco, in March 2018.

Results

Men

Women

Medal table

References
Results - 2018 African Championships, Taekwondo Database

African Taekwondo Championships
2018 in Moroccan sport
2018 in taekwondo
Taekwondo Championships
Taekwondo in Morocco
Taekwondo Championships